Dagupan, officially the City of Dagupan, is a 2nd class independent component city in the Ilocos Region, Philippines. According to the 2020 census, it has a population of 174,302 people.

Located on Lingayen Gulf on the northwest-central part of the island of Luzon, Dagupan is a major commercial and financial center north of Manila. Also, the city is one of the centers of modern medical services, education, media and communication in North-Central Luzon. The city is situated within the fertile Agno River Valley and is in turn a part of the larger Central Luzon plain.

The city is among the top producers of milkfish (locally known as bangus) in the province. From 2001 to 2003, Dagupan's milkfish production totaled to 35,560.1 metric tons (MT), contributing 16.8 percent to the total provincial production. Of its total production in the past three years, 78.5 percent grew in fish pens/cages while the rest grew in brackish water fishponds.

Dagupan is administratively and politically independent from the provincial government of Pangasinan and is only represented by the province's legislative district.

Dagupan is one of the proposed metropolitan area in the Philippines. Metro Dagupan is proposed to include the independent component city of Dagupan, as well as the towns of Binmaley, Calasiao, Lingayen, Manaoag, Mangaldan, Mapandan, San Fabian, San Jacinto, and Santa Barbara.

Etymology 
The city's name was derived from the local Pangasinan word pandaragupan, meaning "gathering place" as the city has been a regional market center for centuries.

History

Caboloan 

During the 15th century, Pangasinan had been the site of an ancient polity called the Caboloan (kingdom of Pangasinan), which sent emissaries to China in 1406–1411.

Spanish Occupation 
The area that is now known as Dagupan was described as marshland thickly covered with mangrove and nipa palm trees. The natives lived along the shoreline and riverbanks of Calmay, Pantal, and Bonuan. But there were also communities in Malued, Lasip, Pogo, and Bacayao. The natives called the area Bacnotan which would later be incorporated into the encomienda of Lingayen that was established in 1583.

The first long distance railroad in the Philippines connecting Manila and Dagupan was opened on November 24, 1892.

Japanese occupation 

The Japanese planes bombed in Dagupan in December 1941; Dagupan was occupied by Japanese forces starting in 1942.
The city also served as a wartime capital of Pangasinan.

Allied Liberation 

On January 8–9, 1945, U.S. General Douglas MacArthur landed his amphibious liberation force in the city's "Blue Beach" section in Bonuan Gueset along the shores of Lingayen Gulf. From his beachhead in Dagupan, along with those in neighboring towns Lingayen, Binmaley and San Fabian, MacArthur's forces under General Walter Krueger together with the Philippine Commonwealth troops under the Philippine Army and Philippine Constabulary units were able to penetrate Japanese defenses in Luzon island and liberate Filipino and allied prisoners of war near Cabanatuan in the province of Nueva Ecija, and in Manila's University of Santo Tomas, among others.

Cityhood 

Dagupan became a city by virtue of Republic Act No. 170, authored by House Speaker Eugenio Pérez. It was signed into law by President Manuel Roxas on June 20, 1947.

Contemporary History 
The westward expansion of the city went as far as Lucao, which was also swampland. Local historian Restituto Basa surmised that the name Lucao may have been derived from the shellfish called lukan that used to abound in the swampy area. 

In June 1962, Dagupan was shaken by a series of strong earthquakes which occurred at irregular intervals for about three weeks. The quakes toppled the belfry of the Roman Catholic Church.  Many people from Calmay, Carael and island barrios evacuated to other towns. 

In 1968, the national government agencies opened offices in Dagupan and other key cities across the country. The daytime population increased substantially, causing congestion in the city that began to see the appearance of public utility tricycles and other modes of transportation.

On July 16, 1990, a magnitude 7.7 earthquake struck northern Luzon, causing liquefaction, which made buildings tilt and sink due to their heavy weight and the looseness of the ground, which turned into sediment-rich mud. The Magsaysay Bridge, one of the two bridges especially spanning the Pantal River, collapsed, delaying people from crossing to the other banks and vice versa. Major damage caused businesses to be permanently transferred to the neighbouring towns of Mangaldan and Calasiao, but somehow, Dagupan and its inhabitants managed to recover from the earthquake.

At the turn of the millenium, seeking to promote the thriving Milkfish industry that harnessed the city as the Milkfish capital of the country, The Bangus Festival was formally launched in 2002 by then-Mayor Benjamin Lim. The city earned the World's Longest Barbecue record from the Guinness World Records in 2003 during the holding of the Kalutan ed Dalan where 10,000 pieces of bangus were grilled on the longest barbecue grill measuring 1,007.56 meters long.

Geography 

Land use is primarily for agriculture with 35.98% of the total land area, fishpond, cropland, residential with 22.88%; others uses are commercial, industrial, institutional, government private, parks and roads.

Barangays 
Dagupan is politically subdivided into 31 barangays. These barangays are headed by elected officials: Barangay Captain, Barangay Council, whose members are called Barangay Councilors. All are elected every three years.

Climate 

Dagupan has a tropical monsoon climate (Köppen climate classification: Am). It is in Type I climate zone in the Modified Coronas' Climate Classification, with a pronounced dry season from November to April.

Demographics 

In Dagupan, the Pangasinans are the predominant people and the Pangasinan language is predominantly used in the city and environs, followed by Filipino and English, as well as Ilocano, mainly in Calmay and Pantal. Chinese is mainly spoken only by a few city individuals of Chinese descent.
 Number of Registered Voters (2016): 105,183

Economy 

Dagupan is the economic center of Pangasinan. As a major regional hub, many people in Pangasinan and nearby provinces commute to the city during the day. This causes the city's daytime population to rise and cause traffic to parts of the city, especially the downtown area. The city is a vital financial center housing numerous banks, non-bank financial institutions, headquarters of corporations and offices of major government departments and agencies.

Historically, Dagupan was a center for salt making in numerous salt evaporator beds in the low-lying swampy areas close to Lingayen Gulf, Beginning in the 19th Century, some of the salt making operations gave way to pond culture of fish, most prominently the milkfish or as it is known locally as bangus for which the city has become famous.  Fisheries, aquaculture and processed fisheries products are an important mainstay of the city's economy.

Manila-based developers have also set shop in this bustling city due to its strategic location and growing population.

▪ Santa Lucia Land Inc. (Almeria Verde Subdivision)

▪ Double Dragon Properties (CityMall Mayombo, opened 2018)

▪ SM Prime Holdings (SM Center Dagupan [opened 2019], planned SM Savemore Dagupan, and planned SM City Dagupan)

▪ 11-storey Allied Care Experts Medical Center

▪ Green Sun Management Inc. & Megaworld Construction and Development Corporation (5 storey Green Sun Hotel)

▪ Filinvest (Fora Dagupan – a  Townscape development)

▪ Vester Corporation – Bayani Hall condominium, Arellano St., Dagupan

As of June 2020, Dagupan is one of the 25 cities in the country identified as an area with “high-potential in IT-BPM industry” for transformation into “digital cities” by 2025.

Sitel, a global business process outsourcing (BPO) firm, has recently opened its first Sitel MAXhub in Dagupan, bringing more jobs to aspiring BPO professionals in Dagupan city. The company is now actively seeking to expand more in the city.

Local businessmen have also gone with the trend in developing their properties in different locations which further boosts the city's construction activities and secures the city's title as the economic hub of Pangasinan.

Another part of Dagupan's economy is the motor vehicle industry centered around Caranglaan and Lucao districts. Many automotive companies have a dealership in the city's metropolitan area. Existing car dealerships from major companies including Ford, Hyundai, Chevrolet, Mazda and Isuzu are all found in Dagupan, while other companies such as Toyota, Honda, Mitsubishi, Nissan and many more are found at the neighbouring town of Calasiao.

Tourism 
Dagupan is a historic city that boasts numerous historical, cultural heritage, recreational, ecotourism, business, and culinary tourism of national importance.

Being at the center of trade in the north for centuries blessed with a geography crisscrossed by several rivers and sandy beaches, Dagupan has naturally become a multifaceted city in terms of tourism. Also, as the transportation hub of Pangasinan, the city is easily accessible to the public, whether coming from within or outside of the province.

Historical & Heritage Tourism 
Since the Spanish colonial times, the colonial government had put a great emphasis on the importance of the city due to being at the strategic center of the province and its accessibility to the sea for trading and transport. The first Philippine railroad system, the Manila-Dagupan railway, had its terminus in the city. Remnant of the historic rail transport locomotive can be seen displayed infront of the city museum.

During World War 2, Dagupan also served as the wartime capital of Pangasinan. The shores of Bonuan Gueset was a silent witness to the historic landing of Gen. MacArthur that eventually became one of the key historic points in the country's liberation. To immortalize this important feat in the city's history, a MacArthur Landing Park was built to stand by the shore of Tondaligan Beach, adjacent to Filipino-Japanese Peace Park.

More structures and landmarks of historic importance still dot the city, some of which are already listed as heritage sites by the National Historical Commission of the Philippines (NHCP). These include:
• Home Economics/Gabaldon Building at West Central Elementary School
• Old City Hall and Water Tower
• Metropolitan Cathedral of Saint John
• Philippine National Railways Tracks and Station
• Remnants of Franklin Bridge
• Lighthouse in Bonuan

Food Tourism 
 Aside from being the Bangus Capital of the Philippines, the city is also known as the Kitchen of the North. Many popular culinary traditions have originated in the city, including Pigar-Pigar, Kaleskes, and Bonuan Boneless Bangus. Plato Wraps, a contemporary food innovation that's now popularly sold in major shopping malls also hails from the city.

Dagupan is home to popular homegrown restaurants that branched out in many parts of Luzon. These include Matutina's Restaurant, Dagupeña Restaurant, Pedritos Restaurant, and Silantro Fil-Mex Cantina, among others.

Food Hubs: 
• Metro Plaza (International and national food and resto chains such as Starbucks, Yellow Cab Pizza)
• Galvan Street (The center for local Dagupan cuisines such as Pigar-Pigar, Kaleskes and other native dishes)
• Tondaligan Food Hub (Alfresco dining by the beach hosting native delicacies, street foods and selected food kiosks)
• Rivergrove Lifestyle Center (A modern food hub by the river hosting popular restaurants & cafes such as Tim Hortons, Army Navy, Cabalen)
• Plaza Del Carmen (Hosts traditional and innovative cafes, bars and restaurants such as Bside Bistro, Carne'val Mexican Grill, Mankape, among others)
• Royal Rays Food Hub (A hub for Filipino and Asian dining, such as Ikura by Hagemu, Juliana's Kitchen, Sangkalan and Moonleaf Cafe)

Ecotourism 

Dagupan, being surrounded by rivers and sea, offers extensive ecotourism activities for recreation, relaxation and adventure.

Tondaligan Beach is an urban beach park complex with numerous amenities. The extensive Tondaligan baywalk, dubbed as the longest in the region, is a prominent feature along the Bonuan shore wherein cyclists can enjoy biking and savor Lingayen Gulf's picturesque view.

Tondaligan Beach Park also hosts many historical landmark of national importance such as:
 Gen. MacArthur Landing Park
 Filipino-Japanese Garden Park
 Tondaligan Grand Amphitheater

Other interesting spots and landmarks in the city  that can be visited are as follows:
 Dawel River Cruise
 BFAR – NIFTDC
 Pugaro Beach
 Bonuan Golf Course
 Leisure Coast Resort

Festivities 
Being the Bangus (Milkfish) Capital of the Philippines, Dagupan has been celebrating its well-renowned produce through Bangus Festival which started in 2002. It's a month-long celebration every April annually. A historic Guinness World Record for the longest barbecue measuring 1,007.56 meters (3,305.64 feet) was achieved by the people of Dagupan on May 3, 2003.

The festival features the famous bangusine (bangus cuisine) which is one of the main highlights of the event, street dancing where competing barangays parade in the city's main avenue wearing colorful Bangus Festival costumes, bangus grilling, deboning, variety shows, trade fairs, beauty pageants, sports fest, cooking show, medical mission, visual arts, band concerts, sports activities, dog show, fluvial parade, drum and lyre parade, and street party. The festival concludes every April 30 with main events: Kalutan ed Dalan in the daytime and Bangusan Street Party concerts in the nighttime.

Pista'y Dayat (Festival of the Sea) is held the day after the conclusion of Bangus Festival. It is simultaneously being celebrated together with all the neighboring towns in the Lingayen Gulf area. It serves as a thanksgiving for the bountiful harvest and abundant fishing from the sea in the Province of Pangasinan.

Dagupan city fiesta is a month-long celebration held every December with a Catholic fiesta mass and Procession at St. John Cathedral in honor of St. John the Evangelist, the patron saint of Dagupan and of fishermen.

Since it coincides with the Christmas festivities, Christmas decoration-building, nativity scene displays and Christmas tree using indigenous materials has become a permanent fixture in the Dagupan city fiesta.

On The Edades Day, events such as Arts and Painting Contests are held on December 23, honoring national artist on Modern Arts Victorio Edades, a Dagupeño from Barangay Bolosan. Other events such Miss Dagupan pageant, job fairs, NGO, Organizations, & Barangay Nights, various alumni homecoming Nights, Battle of Bands, and Hip Hop Dance Contest, among others are usually parts of the festivities. The Dagupan city fiesta ends on Rizal Day at the City Plaza.

Government 
Dagupan, belonging to the fourth congressional district of the province of Pangasinan, is governed by a mayor designated as its local chief executive and by a municipal council as its legislative body in accordance with the Local Government Code. The mayor, vice mayor, and the councilors are elected directly by the people through an election which is being held every three years.

Elected officials

Transportation

Road and Railway Systems 
Dagupan is connected with other cities by networks of national roads. Romulo Highway and Pangasinan – La Union Road (N55) and Urdaneta – Dagupan Road (N56) are the principal highways that serve the city.

The Philippine National Railways (PNR) once served Dagupan through Dagupan station, that went defunct in the late 1980s. The first railroad in the Philippines, the Manila-Dagupan Railway, terminated at the city.

Bus 

Intercity/interprovincial buses from Manila serve the city, and are usually operated by Dagupan Bus Company, Victory Liner, Five Star, and Pangasinan Solid North. Jeepneys provide intracity travel, as well as for towns and cities of close proximities.

Taxi Service 

Since 2019, Taxi service becomes available as the newest transportation mode in the city.  It is the first ever taxi operation in Region 1 and is authorized to serve Pangasinan and the entire Region 1. Dagupan was chosen as the launching area being the center of business and education in North Central Luzon.

Modern Jeepney 
 
Modern PUVs, more commonly known as Modern Jeeps, are now plying in different parts of the city as part of the nationwide PUJs modernization campaign. They are equipped with CCTV camera, air conditioning, a television, and equipments to comply with the government’s health and safety protocols against COVID-19.

Healthcare 
Medical and health service centers abound in Dagupan. Out of 51 hospitals in Pangasinan, 12 are located in the city. The largest of these is the Region 1 Medical Center with hospital bed capacity of 1000. Other notable hospitals are Dagupan Doctors Villaflor Memorial Hospital, Nazareth General Hospital, and The Medical City Pangasinan.

Education 
Since the colonial era, Dagupan has always been the center of education in Ilocos Region (Region 1). The private sector-driven centers of education University of Pangasinan, Universidad de Dagupan, University of Luzon and Lyceum-Northwestern University lead, 14 colleges and 18 vocational schools and 3 technical learning centers, 19 secondary schools and 53 elementary schools both in public and private.

Colleges and universities 
Asiacareer College Foundation
Aie College – Dagupan Campus
AMA Computer College – Dagupan Campus
Universidad de Dagupan
Dagupan Colleges Foundation
Escuela de Nuestra Señora de La Salette
Kingfisher School of Business and Finance
Lyceum-Northwestern University
Mary Help of Christians College Seminary
Pangasinan Merchant Marine Academy
Pimsat Colleges
STI College – Dagupan Campus
University of Luzon
University of Pangasinan

Public secondary schools 
Bonuan Boquig National High School
Carael National High School
Dagupan City National High School
Judge Jose de Venecia, Sr. Technical-Vocational Secondary School
Salapingao National High School
East Central Integrated School
Pugaro Integrated School
 Federico N. Ceralde Integrated School (cj)

Private primary and secondary schools 
St. Michael School By-the-Sea
Clifford Interactive Learning School
Colegio de Dagupan
Divine Word Academy of Dagupan
Dominican School
Ednas School
Escuela de Nuestra Señora de La Salette
Genesis Advanced Intech Academy
Graystone Institute of the Philippines
Harvent School
Hilkan Montessori
Instituto Centro Asia
JCCMI Christian Academy
La Marea Academy
Living Lights Academy Foundation
Francisco Q. Duque Medical Foundation Special Science High School
Francisco Q. Duque Medical Foundation Regular High School
Mother Goose Playskool and Gradeschool
Mother Goose Special Science High School
Northfield Academy
Oakridge International School of Young Leaders
Pangasinan Universal Institute
St. Albert the Great School
St. John's Cathedral School
STI College
Asian Institute of E-Commerce
University of Pangasinan
University of Luzon
Lyceum-Northwestern University
Wonderland School of Dagupan Inc.

Media 
Dagupan is home to regional broadcasting stations and television networks. Nineteen radio broadcasting stations (9 AM and 10 FM), at least seventeen local newspapers and three cable television companies operate in the city. Daily flagship regional news over free TV is served by One North Central Luzon (formerly Balitang Amianan) via GMA Dagupan.

TV Stations
GMA TV-10 Dagupan
IBC TV-6 Baguio
PTV-8 Cordillera 
RPN TV-12 Baguio
GTV Channel 22 Baguio
Hope Channel 24 Dagupan
One Sports Channel 36 Baguio
TV5 Channel 28 Baguio
S+A Channel 30 Baguio - (inactive)
ABS-CBN Channel 32 Dagupan - (inactive)

Cable and Satellite TV
Sky Cable Dagupan
USATV
Cignal TV

AM Stations
DZMQ Radyo Pilipinas Dagupan (DZMQ; Philippine Broadcasting Service).
DZRD Sonshine Radio 981 Dagupan (DZRD; Sonshine Media Network International)
DWIN 1080 Radyo Agila (DWIN; Eagle Broadcasting Corporation)
DZWN Bombo Radyo 1125 Dagupan (DZWN; Bombo Radyo Philippines/People's Broadcasting Service)
DWCM 1161 Aksyon Radyo Pangasinan (DWCM; Manila Broadcasting Company/Pacific Broadcasting System)
DZDN 1206 Life Radio Dagupan (DZDN; End-Time Mission Broadcasting Service)
DWPR 1296 Radyo Pilipino Dagupan (DWPR; Radio Corporation of the Philippines)
DZRH 1440 Dagupan (DWDH; Manila Broadcasting Company)
GMA Super Radyo DZSD 1548 Dagupan (Relay station of DZBB 594 Manila) (DZSD; GMA Network, Inc.)

FM Stations
88.1 Radyo Pangasinan (DWJE; Pangasinan Gulf Waves Network Corporation, a former frequency of 95.3 FM from 2019–2021)
DWIZ 89.3 Dagupan (DWIZ; Aliw Broadcasting Corporation, a former branding as Home Radio from 2009–2013)
90.3 Energy FM (DWKT; Ultrasonic Broadcasting System)
93.5 Barangay FM (DWTL; GMA Network, Inc.)
MOR 94.3 Dagupan (DWEC; ABS-CBN Corporation - defunct)
95.3 Radyo Bandera Dagupan (DWFZ is a new FM station since July 4, 2021; Bandera News Philippines/Fairwaves Broadcasting Network)
98.3 Love Radio Dagupan (DWID; Manila Broadcasting Company)
100.7 Star FM Dagupan (DWHY; Bombo Radyo Philippines/People's Broadcasting Service)
104.7 iFM Dagupan (DWON; Radio Mindanao Network)
106.3 Yes FM! Dagupan (DWHR; Manila Broadcasting Company/Pacific Broadcasting System)
DWHT 107.9 (DWHT; Broadcast Enterprises and Affiliated Media)

seventeen local newspapers in Northern Luzon.

News and Public Affairs Programs
Bagong Morning Kapamilya and TV Patrol North Luzon (ABS-CBN TV-32 Dagupan; former)
Kangrunag A Damag (PTV-8 Cordillera
Balitang Amianan and Mornings with GMA Regional TV (GMA Dagupan).

Sister cities 
 Guadalajara, Jalisco, Mexico
 Iwata, Shizuoka, Japan
 Milpitas, California, United States
 Tangier, Tanger-Tetouan-Al Hoceima,  Morocco
 Cabanatuan, Nueva Ecija,  Philippines

References

Further reading 
 Basa, Restituto (1972). Story of Dagupan. Manaois Press.

External links 

 
 Dagupan Tourism
 Profile at the National Competitiveness Council of the Philippines
 Dagupan at the Pangasinan Government Website 
 Local Governance Performance Management System
 [ Philippine Standard Geographic Code]
 Philippine Census Information

 
Cities in Pangasinan
Independent component cities in the Philippines
Populated places established in 1947
1947 establishments in the Philippines